Copperfield is a former town in Baker County, in the U.S. state of Oregon. It is on the west bank of the Snake River and the north bank of Pine Creek, downstream of a feature of the Snake River known as The Oxbow. Copperfield Park, managed by Idaho Power, occupies the former town site. The Geographic Names Information System also lists Copperfield as a variant name for Oxbow, Oregon.

Early history
According to the historian Lewis McArthur, the town was formed in the late 1890s as "Copper Camp", and was inhabited by prospectors of the local copper ore; However, the Oregon writer Stewart Holbrook asserted that "there was no copper in Copperfield", and that the community "had one purpose; namely, to cater to the uninhibited appetites of more than two thousand men who were engaged on two nearby construction projects."

Copperfield was platted around 1898, along a Northwest Railway Company line that never developed. Soon the locality was known as "Copperfield" and a post office established in 1899. The population grew to 1,000 by 1910 because two tunnels were being dug near The Oxbow by the local railroad company and by the predecessor of the Idaho Power Company. This railroad activity was described as a "brawling railroad construction camp" during this period by Barbara Ruth Bailey.

Martial law

As Holbrook describes it, "early in 1913 the construction jobs began to peter out. Fewer men were employed. Competition for the remaining trade became stiff. The saloon keepers began feuding." With stories of arson, the town acquired a reputation for lawlessness. When the county authorities failed to get control of the situation, Governor Oswald West announced he was sending his secretary, Fern Hobbs, with a signed declaration of martial law to clean up the place. The locals, who had been led to believe she was travelling alone, were surprised by state militia who had accompanied Hobbs and enforced martial law on the town after she read the declaration to its inhabitants. A few months after Hobbs' intervention, a fire "of unknown origin destroyed a block or two of the jerry-built structures. No saloon ever reopened."

Ghost town
There were two more fires, and then the post office closed in 1927, essentially turning Copperfield into a ghost town. In 1965, however, the community of Oxbow was founded near the site of Copperfield when the Idaho Power Company was building the Oxbow Dam. The former site of Copperfield is now a park run by Idaho Power.

References

External links
Oregon State Archives: The Copperfield Controversy archived website
Historic images of Copperfield from the Baker County Library

Former populated places in Baker County, Oregon
Populated places established in 1898
Ghost towns in Oregon
1898 establishments in Oregon